George Lucas Paddison (August 9, 1883 – October 17, 1954) was an American assistant professor, lawyer, and sales supervisor.

Biography
Paddison was born in Burgaw, North Carolina on August 9, 1883. He was the son of Alfred Howard Paddison (1849–1927) and Blanche Simpson Paddison (1854–1921). He studied chemistry at the University of North Carolina at Chapel Hill. He graduated Phi Beta Kappa in 1905. He studied further at Kentucky State University and received a Master's degree in Chemistry.  Afterwards Paddison taught as assistant professor of Chemistry at the University of Mississippi while he earned a degree in law. Upon completing his law degree, Paddison practiced law in Greenwood, Mississippi for five years.  In 1914 Paddison took a position with West Publishing Company, where he would work for 32 years, retiring in 1946 as supervisor of sales. West Publishing Co. produced law books, primarily. Upon retiring he returned to North Carolina.

Upon his death he established, by bequest, an endowment at the University of North Carolina at Chapel Hill in the Department of Classics there.  This endowment established permanent faculty positions in Classics.  The Paddison chair has been held by several luminaries in the field of Classical studies, including Thomas Robert Shannon Broughton, Robert J. Getty, Brooks Otis, George Alexander Kennedy, Jerzy Linderski, and William H. Race.  Current Paddison professors at UNC are James O'Hara and Patricia A. Rosenmeyer.

He retired to his hometown of Burgaw, North Carolina. He died on October 17, 1954. He is buried in Burgaw Cemetery.

References

1883 births
1954 deaths
20th-century American lawyers
University of North Carolina alumni
University of Mississippi faculty
People from Burgaw, North Carolina
20th-century American philanthropists
University of Kentucky alumni
University of Mississippi alumni
People from Greenwood, Mississippi